

Herbert Kuppisch (10 December 1909 – 27 August 1943) was a German naval officer during World War II and commander of , , , and . He was a recipient of the Knight's Cross of the Iron Cross. Kuppisch and the crew of U-847 were killed by aircraft from the US escort carrier  on 27 August 1943.

Awards
 Wehrmacht Long Service Award 4th Class (4 October 1937)
 Sudetenland Medal (20 December 1939)
 Iron Cross (1939) 2nd Class (5 December 1939) & 1st Class (4 May 1940)
 U-boat War Badge (4 May 1940)
 Knight's Cross of the Iron Cross on 14 May 1941 as Kapitänleutnant and commander of U-94

References

Citations

Bibliography

 
 

1909 births
1943 deaths
Military personnel from Hamburg
Kriegsmarine personnel killed in World War II
U-boat commanders (Kriegsmarine)
Recipients of the Knight's Cross of the Iron Cross
Reichsmarine personnel
People lost at sea
Deaths by airstrike during World War II